Gentiana parryi, or Parry's gentian, is a species of the genus Gentiana. It is a perennial forb/herb native to Wyoming, Utah, Colorado and New Mexico.

References

parryi
Flora of the Rocky Mountains
Flora of Colorado
Flora of New Mexico
Flora of Wyoming
Flora of Utah
Taxa named by Carl Linnaeus
Flora without expected TNC conservation status